The Ireland cricket team toured India in February and March 2019 to play three Twenty20 Internationals (T20Is), five One Day Internationals (ODIs) and a Test match against the Afghanistan cricket team. It was Ireland's first Test played overseas and the first Test match between the two sides. All of the fixtures took place at the Rajiv Gandhi International Cricket Stadium in Dehradun. The ODI fixtures were part of Afghanistan's preparation for the 2019 Cricket World Cup. In January 2019, the fixtures were brought forward by two days, to avoid clashing with the Indian Premier League.

In the second T20I match, the Afghanistan team set several records. They made the highest team total, with 278 for 3, which included the highest partnership for any wicket, with Hazratullah Zazai and Usman Ghani putting on 236 runs for the first wicket. Hazratullah Zazai scored 162 not out, the highest score for an Afghan batsman in a T20I fixture. Afghanistan went on to win the T20I series 3–0. The ODI series was drawn 2–2, after the second match finished as a no result.

Afghanistan won the one-off Test match by seven wickets to record their first victory in a Test match. They became the joint-second quickest, after England and Pakistan, to record their maiden win in Test cricket. Asghar Afghan, captain of the Afghanistan team said that "it is a historic day for Afghanistan, for Afghanistan people, for our team, for our cricket board". Ireland's captain, William Porterfield, said he was pleased how the five debutants performed and that Afghanistan were deserved winners. Afghanistan's all-rounder Mohammad Nabi, praised both the batting and the bowling from the team saying "it shows we are ready for Test cricket". Player of the match, Rahmat Shah, moved up to 89th place in the ICC Test Player Rankings, the highest-placed batsman for Afghanistan.

Squads

Ahead of the ODI series, Stuart Thompson was added to Ireland's squad. Following the conclusion of the ODI series, Zahir Khan and Sayed Shirzad were both added to Afghanistan's Test squad.

T20I series

1st T20I

2nd T20I

3rd T20I

ODI series

1st ODI

2nd ODI

3rd ODI

4th ODI

5th ODI

Only Test

Notes

References

External links
 Series home at ESPN Cricinfo

2019 in Afghan cricket
2019 in Irish cricket
International cricket competitions in 2018–19
International cricket tours of India
Afghan cricket tours of India 
Irish cricket tours of India